Maurice Eugene Evans (born November 8, 1978) is a retired American professional basketball player.  He most recently played for the Washington Wizards of the National Basketball Association (NBA). He has served as a vice president of the NBA Players Association.

College career
Known for his strong defense and athleticism, Evans played collegiately at Wichita State University for two seasons, but philosophical differences with then-coach Randy Smithson caused him to transfer to the University of Texas at Austin. Evans hired Roger Montgomery as an agent.

Professional career
After not having been selected in the 2001 NBA Draft, he signed as a free agent for the Minnesota Timberwolves, where he played in only 10 games. In 2002, he moved to Greece to play for Olympiacos, and in the following, 2003–04 season he played for the Italian power Benetton Basket Treviso (winning the Italian Cup). In 2004, he made the roster for the NBA's Sacramento Kings, and became a rotation player. He started 11 of 65 games, and played 19 minutes per game on the season, contributing 6.4 points. In 2005, he was signed as a free agent by the Detroit Pistons, where he was reunited with his former coach and close friend Flip Saunders, and played a rotation role of 14 minutes per game, averaging 5.2 points per game.

On June 28, 2006, the Pistons traded Evans to the Los Angeles Lakers for the draft rights to Cheikh Samb, following Evans' request to be moved to a team where he would be given more playing time. He served as a bench player for the Lakers, largely as the back up to Kobe Bryant.

On November 20, 2007, he along with teammate Brian Cook were traded to the Orlando Magic in exchange for Trevor Ariza. He became the Magic's starting shooting guard, contributing to the team's 52–30 record and landing the 3rd seed in the Eastern Conference for the 2008 Playoffs.

Evans agreed to terms on a 3-year contract from the Atlanta Hawks worth about $7.5 million on July 25, 2008. At the time, he was on the verge of signing a three-year deal with the Golden State Warriors. On May 7, 2009, Evans scored a postseason career-best 16 points during an Eastern Conference Semifinals Game 2 loss to the Cleveland Cavaliers. February 23, 2011, he was traded to the Washington Wizards.

Evans has since retired. Evans' final NBA game was on April 26, 2012 in a 104 - 70 win over the Miami Heat where he recorded 18 points and 1 assist.

In 2017, Evans joined the Killer 3's of the BIG3 basketball league, playing alongside coach/player Charles Oakley, Chauncey Billups, and Stephen Jackson, among others.

NBA career statistics

Regular season

|-
| align="left" | 
| align="left" | Minnesota
| 10 || 0 || 4.5 || .474 || .000 || .750 || .4 || .4 || .0 || .0 || 2.1
|-
| align="left" | 
| align="left" | Sacramento
| 65 || 11 || 19.0 || .442 || .329 || .756 || 3.1 || .7 || .6 || .1 || 6.4
|-
| align="left" | 
| align="left" | Detroit
| 80 || 1 || 14.2 || .452 || .371 || .800 || 2.0 || .8 || .5 || .2 || 5.0
|-
| align="left" | 
| align="left" | L.A. Lakers
| 76 || 10 || 22.8 || .432 || .361 || .787 || 2.9 || 1.0 || .5 || .2 || 8.4
|-
| align="left" | 
| align="left" | L.A. Lakers
| 7 || 0 || 13.7 || .321 || .143 || .800 || 1.3 || 1.7 || .7 || .1 || 4.4
|-
| align="left" | 
| align="left" | Orlando
| 68 || 47 || 23.9 || .489 || .396 || .691 || 3.1 || 1.0 || .6 || .1 || 9.3
|-
| align="left" | 
| align="left" | Atlanta
| 80 || 25 || 23.0 || .432 || .395 || .822 || 3.0 || .7 || .6 || .1 || 7.2
|-
| align="left" | 
| align="left" | Atlanta
| 79 || 5 || 16.7 || .445 || .337 || .754 || 1.9 || .6 || .4 || .2 || 5.7
|-
| align="left" | 
| align="left" | Atlanta
| 47 || 12 || 17.8 || .393 || .315 || .857 || 1.8 || .6 || .3 || .1 || 4.5
|-
| align="left" | 
| align="left" | Washington
| 26 || 12 || 27.4 || .439 || .346 || .933 || 2.8 || .6 || .7 || .3 || 9.7
|-
| align="left" | 
| align="left" | Washington
| 24 || 0 || 14.3 || .402 || .378 || .769 || 1.0 || .4 || .6 || .0 || 4.9
|-
| align="center" colspan="2" | Career
| 562 || 123 || 19.4 || .442 || .363 || .785 || 2.5 || .7 || .5 || .2 || 6.7

Playoffs

|-
| align="left" | 2005
| align="left" | Sacramento
| 3 || 0 || 18.7 || .600 || .500 || .800 || 2.3 || 1.0 || .7 || .0 || 6.0
|-
| align="left" | 2006
| align="left" | Detroit
| 16 || 0 || 6.3 || .533 || .636 || .875 || .9 || .2 || .1 || .1 || 3.3
|-
| align="left" | 2007
| align="left" | L.A. Lakers
| 5 || 0 || 16.4 || .385 || .385 || .000 || 1.6 || .6 || .4 || .0 || 5.0
|-
| align="left" | 2008
| align="left" | Orlando
| 10 || 10 || 28.2 || .507 || .417 || .625 || 2.5 || .7 || .8 || .1 || 9.0
|-
| align="left" | 2009
| align="left" | Atlanta
| 11 || 8 || 24.1 || .431 || .286 || .667 || 1.5 || .9 || .5 || .3 || 6.2
|-
| align="left" | 2010
| align="left" | Atlanta
| 11 || 0 || 13.5 || .297 || .300 || .000 || 1.2 || .2 || .8 || .0 || 2.3
|-
| align="center" colspan="2" | Career
| 56 || 18 || 16.7 || .447 || .392 || .771 || 1.5 || .5 || .5 || .1 || 5.0

Notes

External links

NBA Profile

1978 births
Living people
African-American basketball players
American expatriate basketball people in Greece
American expatriate basketball people in Italy
American men's basketball players
Atlanta Hawks players
Basketball players from Wichita, Kansas
Big3 players
Detroit Pistons players
Los Angeles Lakers players
Minnesota Timberwolves players
Olympiacos B.C. players
Orlando Magic players
Pallacanestro Treviso players
Sacramento Kings players
Shooting guards
Small forwards
Texas Longhorns men's basketball players
Undrafted National Basketball Association players
Wichita State Shockers men's basketball players
Washington Wizards players
21st-century African-American sportspeople
20th-century African-American sportspeople
American men's 3x3 basketball players